Chariesthes bechynei is a species of beetle in the family Cerambycidae. It was described by Stephan von Breuning in 1953. It is known from Guinea.

References

External links
 

Chariesthes
Beetles described in 1953